Raiders of the Range is a 1942 American Western "Three Mesquiteers" B-movie directed by John English.

Cast 
 Bob Steele as Tucson Smith
 Tom Tyler as Stony Brooke
 Rufe Davis as Lullaby Joslin
 Lois Collier as Jean Travers
 Frank Jaquet as Sam Daggett
 Tom Chatterton as 'Doc' Higgins
 Charles Miller as John Travers
 Dennis Moore as Foster
 Fred Kohler Jr. as Henchman Plummer
 Max Waizmann as The Coroner (as Max Waizman)
 Hal Price as Sheriff

References

External links 

1942 films
1942 Western (genre) films
American Western (genre) films
American black-and-white films
Films directed by John English
Republic Pictures films
Three Mesquiteers films
1940s English-language films
1940s American films